Collider is a studio album, released in 2003, by the Australia-based New Zealand rock band Fur Patrol. It peaked at 31 on the New Zealand album chart.

Album

Track listing (AU)
"Precious" – 2:58
"Get Along" – 3:10
"Rocket" – 3:34
"Enemy" – 5:32
"Into the Sun" – 5:15
"Softer Landing" – 5:07
"Fade Away" – 4:40
"Someone You Really Want" – 6:32
"All These Things" – 4:13
"Art of Conversation" – 5:42
"Little Heart" – 6:07

Charts

References 

2003 albums
Fur Patrol albums